The first Dumfries and Galloway regional council election took place on 7 May 1974, along with the first district council elections in Scotland. This new system was created by the Local Government (Scotland) Act 1973, which saw the making of a two-tier system of local government. The area Dumfries and Galloway regional council covered also contained 4 district councils:

 Annandale and Eskdale
 Nithsdale
 Merrick
 Stewartry

As with many other councils in this election, independents formed the majority of councillors, with only Labour behind them with 2 seats. This was also reflected in the district council elections in Dumfries and Galloway and much of Scotland.

Turnout was low, which is the norm for local elections, but what was shocking about this election is the amount of uncontested wards. 12 out of the 35 wards in Dumfries and Galloway were uncontested, meaning over a third of the electorate couldn't vote on their representative. Again, this was reflected in the district council elections in the region.

References

Dumfries
Dumfries and Galloway Council elections